The siege of Polotsk might refer to several sieges of the city:

Siege of Polotsk (1381) by forces of Skirgaila against Andrei of Polotsk
Siege of Polotsk (1513) by forces of the Grand Duchy of Moscow during the Fourth Muscovite–Lithuanian War (1512–1522)
Siege of Polotsk (1518) by forces of the Grand Duchy of Moscow during the Fourth Muscovite–Lithuanian War (1512–1522)
Siege of Polotsk (1563) by forces of the Grand Duchy of Moscow during the Livonian War (1558–1582)
Siege of Polotsk (1579) by forces of the Polish–Lithuanian Commonwealth during the Livonian War (1558–1582)
Siege of Polotsk (1654) by forces of the Grand Duchy of Moscow during the Russo-Polish War (1654–67)

See also

 First Battle of Polotsk (17-18 August 1812)
 Second Battle of Polotsk (17-19 October 1812)